is a Japanese animator, filmmaker and actor. He is best known for creating the anime series Neon Genesis Evangelion (1995). His style is defined by his postmodernist approach and the extensive portrayal of characters' thoughts and emotions, often through unconventional scenes presenting the mental deconstruction of those characters. The Evangelion franchise has had a significant influence on the anime television industry and Japanese popular culture, with many deeming Anno as one of the medium's first auteurs.

Anno's other directorial works include Daicon Film's Return of Ultraman (1983), Gunbuster (1988), Nadia: The Secret of Blue Water (1990), Kare Kano (1998), Love & Pop (1998), Shiki-Jitsu (2000), Cutie Honey (2004), Re: Cutie Honey (2004), Rebuild of Evangelion (2007–2021), and Shin Godzilla (2016), the latter film marking the beginning of the Shin trilogy of tokusatsu franchise reboots with Shinji Higuchi, followed by Shin Ultraman (2022) and Shin Kamen Rider (2023). Several of Anno's anime have won the Animage Anime Grand Prix award, including Nadia: The Secret of Blue Water in 1990, Neon Genesis Evangelion in 1995 and 1996, and The End of Evangelion in 1997.

Biography

Childhood and personal life
The son of Fumiko and Takuya Anno, Anno was born in Ube, Yamaguchi; he attended Wakō Kindergarten, Unoshima Municipal Elementary School, Fujiyama Municipal Junior High School, and Yamaguchi Prefectural Ube High School where he was noted for his interest in artwork and making short films for Japanese Cultural Festivals.

Early work

Anno began his career while attending Osaka University of Arts as an animator for the anime series The Super Dimension Fortress Macross (1982–1983). Wrapped up in producing the DAICON III and IV Opening Animations with his fellow students, and also busy making self-financed films, Anno stopped paying his tuition, eventually getting expelled from Osaka University of Arts. He did not gain recognition until the release of his work on Hayao Miyazaki's 1984 film Nausicaä of the Valley of the Wind. Running short on animators, the film's production studio posted an ad in the famous Japanese animation magazine Animage, announcing that they were in desperate need of more animators. Anno, in his early twenties at the time, read the ad and headed down to the film's studio, where he met with Miyazaki and showed him some of his drawings. Impressed with his ability, Miyazaki hired him to draw some of the most complicated scenes near the end of the movie, and valued his work highly.

Anno went on to become one of the co-founders of Gainax in December 1984. He worked as an animation director for their first feature-length film, Royal Space Force: The Wings of Honneamise (1987), and ultimately became Gainax's premiere anime director, leading the majority of the studio's projects such as Gunbuster (1988) and Nadia: The Secret of Blue Water (1990–1991). However, Anno fell into a four-year depression following Nadia — the series was handed down to him from NHK from an original concept by Hayao Miyazaki (of which Castle in the Sky is also partly based upon) and he was given little creative control. In 1994, the minor planet 9081 Hideakianno was named after him by his old friend Akimasa Nakamura.

Neon Genesis Evangelion

Anno's next project was the anime television series Neon Genesis Evangelion (1995–1996). The series is set in a post-apocalyptic futurist version of Tokyo and follows humanity's struggle to survive against an onslaught of giant monsters known as Angels. Anno's history of clinical depression was the main source for many of the psychological elements of the series and its characters, as he wrote down on paper several of the trials and tribulations of his condition. During the show's production, Anno became disenchanted with the Japanese "otaku" lifestyle. For this and other reasons (although perhaps by design as well), Evangelions plot became increasingly dark and psychological as the series progressed, despite being broadcast in a children's television timeslot. Anno felt that people should be exposed to the realities of life at as young an age as possible, and by the end of the series all attempts at traditional narrative logic were abandoned, as the final two episodes take place within the main character's mind.

The show did not garner high ratings in Japan at its initial time slot, but after being moved to a later, more adult-oriented venue, it gained considerable popularity. Timing constraints at Gainax also forced Anno to replace the planned ending of Evangelion with two episodes set in the main characters' minds. In 1997, Gainax launched a project to re-adapt Evangelions scrapped ending into a feature-length film. Budgeting issues left the film unfinished, and the completed 27 minutes of animation were included as the second act of Evangelion: Death and Rebirth. In response, Anno received several letters both of encouragement and criticism. Eventually, the project culminated in The End of Evangelion, a three-act film that served as a finale to Neon Genesis Evangelion. In September 1999, Anno appeared on the NHK TV-documentary "Welcome Back for an Extracurricular Lesson, Senpai!", answering some Evangelion-related questions, including the origin of the name Evangelion, and teaching children about animation production.

Anno wrote and directed Evangelion: 3.0+1.0 Thrice Upon a Time (2021), launched in March 2021, after being rescheduled twice due to COVID-19 pandemic. He stated that Shinji's story was completed, but mentioned that he had more ideas set in Evangelion's world.

Subsequent work

After Evangelion, Anno directed the 1998 anime series Kareshi Kanojo no Jijō (Kare Kano for short, also known in English as His and Her Circumstances), the first Gainax television series to be directly adapted from previously written material. During the production of Kare Kano, Anno became frustrated with the restrictions placed on the show by TV Tokyo after the Pokémon seizure incident and has not directed television anime since then. The director has also made forays into live-action films, beginning with Love & Pop (1998), a cinéma vérité-style film about enjo kosai ("compensated dating", a form of teenage prostitution) in Japan, of which a major portion was shot on miniature digital cameras with constantly shifting aspect ratios. He won Best New Director Award at 1998 Yokohama Film Festival for the film. Asumi Miwa who played the lead role won Best New Talent award respectively. He and his friend Masayuki also directed the documentary "GAMERA1999" which documented the production of Gamera 3: Revenge of Iris. His second live-action film, Shiki-Jitsu (2000) ("Ritual Day" or "Ceremonial Day"), is the story of a burnt-out former animation director (played by popular indie director Shunji Iwai) who falls in love with a woman disconnected from reality. Though an experimental work like Love & Pop, this film was shot using the more traditional 2.35:1 aspect ratio and has a generally more polished presentation, eschewing the cinéma vérité grittiness of Anno's first live-action film. This movie earned him Best Artistic Contribution Award at Tokyo International Film Festival and very positive reviews.

Anno's third live-action film was Cutie Honey, based on Go Nagai's 1973 manga and anime series. Released in the summer of 2004, this lighthearted fantasy/superhero film was a stark contrast to his earlier, more realist live-action works.  Later in 2004, Anno supervised but did not direct the three-part OVA, Re: Cutie Honey, which was respectively directed by Hiroyuki Imaishi (part 1), Takamichi Itō (part 2), and Masayuki (part 3). Also released in 2004 was the movie , in which Anno makes several acting cameos: as the student in the front row of the "Home Room!" skit sitting next to Hataru, in "Who's the Director?" as an animator who feels he is being overworked, and finally in "Singles Picnic" he is among the men awaiting females who never come.

On August 1, 2006, Hideaki Anno's official website was updated with job listings for key animators and production staff at a company he founded, Studio Khara. In September 2006, Anno's departure from Gainax was reported in the October edition of the Japanese animation magazine Newtype. On September 9, 2006, GAINAX's official website confirmed that Rebuild of Evangelion was in the works. The first three movies would be an alternate retelling of the TV series (including many new scenes, settings, backgrounds, characters), and the fourth movie would be a completely new conclusion to the story.  Kazuya Tsurumaki and Masayuki would direct the movies while Yoshiyuki Sadamoto would provide character designs and Ikuto Yamashita would provide mechanical designs. Shinji Higuchi would provide storyboards for the first movie. The first was launched in Summer 2007, and the second and third were planned to be launched in 2008, however, the second installment was released by itself on June 27, 2009. The third movie was to be released simultaneously with the fourth, instead, the third movie was released on November 17, 2012, and the release date for the fourth movie in Japan was announced to be June 27, 2020. On February 17, 2007, Anno published an official statement on the Japanese Yahoo Portal for the films regarding his personal involvement and goals in their production. In October 2007, Hideaki Anno resigned from Gainax. In 2011 Anno co-produced the Koinobori Pictures movie Kantoku Shikkaku ("Failed Director"), directed by Katsuyuki Hirano featuring Yumika Hayashi.

In 2012, Anno was the curator of an exhibit entitled Tokusatsu- Special Effects Museum-Craftsmanship of Showa and Heisei Eras Seen Through Miniatures, held at the Museum of Contemporary Art Tokyo, featuring actual props and suits from many of Japan's tokusatsu films and TV shows. Anno also produced a short live-action film for the exhibit, entitled A Giant Warrior Descends on Tokyo, featuring the Giant Warrior-God from Studio Ghibli's animated film Nausicaä of the Valley of the Wind. He has gone on to work with Hayao Miyazaki and Studio Ghibli on several short films which have been shown at the Ghibli Museum. He also voiced the main character Jiro Horikoshi in Miyazaki's 2013 feature film The Wind Rises. He also designed the Space Battleship Yamato 2199 sci-fi anime television series opening sequence. In 2014, Anno and Studio Khara launched Japan Animator Expo, a series of original net animations made by various directors. In March 2015, it was announced that Anno would team up with close friend and Gainax cofounder Shinji Higuchi to write and codirect Shin Godzilla, the 2016 reboot of Toho's Godzilla franchise.

Depictions
Anno has appeared in manga twice, both created by personal acquaintances. His wife, Moyoko Anno, wrote Insufficient Direction, a chronicle of their courtship and marriage and depicting Anno's "true face" as "the founder of the otaku cult". In 2007, a college-age version of him appeared alongside other Gainax founders Hiroyuki Yamaga, Takami Akai, and Toshio Okada in the Kazuhiko Shimamoto manga Aoi Honō. Anno attended Osaka University of Arts with Shimamoto. Aoi Honō was adapted into a live-action television drama in 2014, where Anno was played by actor Ken Yasuda. The 2014 animated series Shirobako has a walk-on appearance by a character named "Mitsuaki Kanno", a caricature of Anno.

Personal life 
On March 26, 2002, Anno married his wife, manga artist Moyoco Anno. He is an agnostic and has stated that he has found Japanese spiritualism to be closest to his personal beliefs. Anno is also a vegetarian.

Filmography

Film

Short Film

Producer only

Television

Animation / art work

Storyboards
 Mahoromatic: Automatic Maiden (2001)
 Magical Shopping Arcade Abenobashi (2002)
 Aim for the Top 2! Diebuster (2004–2006)
 Sugar Sugar Rune (2005–2006)
 Rebuild of Evangelion (2007–2021)
 Space Battleship Yamato 2199 (2012–2013)

Animator
 Daicon III and IV Opening Animations (1981, 1983)
 The Super Dimension Fortress Macross (1982–1983)
 Nausicaä of the Valley of the Wind (1984)
 The Super Dimension Fortress Macross: Do You Remember Love? (1984)
 Birth (1984)
 Cream Lemon (Episode 4) (1985–1987)
 Urusei Yatsura (Episode 133) (1984–1986)
 Urusei Yatsura 3: Remember My Love (1985)
 Royal Space Force: The Wings of Honnêamise (1987)
 Crystal Triangle (1987)
 Dangaioh (1987–1989)
 Battle Royal High School (1987)
 Madox-01 (1987)
 Grave of the Fireflies (1988)
 Baoh the Visitor (1989)
 Nadia: The Secret of Blue Water (1990–1991)
 Crimson Wolf (1993)
 Macross Plus (1994–1995)
 Giant Robo: The Day the Earth Stood Still (1994–1998)
 Macross Plus Movie Edition (1995)
 FLCL (2000–2001)
 Magical Shopping Arcade Abenobashi (2002)
 Aim for the Top 2! Diebuster (2004–2006)

Mechanical designer
 Daicon III and IV Opening Animations  (1981, 1983) (Mecha designer and mechanical animator)
 Mobile Suit Gundam: Char's Counterattack (1988) (Mecha designer)
 Magical Shopping Arcade Abenobashi (2002) (Mechanical animator)

Acting credits
 Return of Ultraman: MAT Arrow 1 Takeoff Order (1983) as Ultraman
 Yamata no Orochi no Gyakushū (1985) as TV reporter
 Otaku no Video (1991) (A Portrait of an Otaku interview, uncredited)
 Abunai deka forever the movie (1998)
 FLCL (2000–2001) (Voice of Miyu-Miyu, uncredited)
 Frog River (2002) as Bar owner
 Magical Shopping Arcade Abenobashi (2002) (Cameo role in Episode 12, uncredited)
 Cutie Honey (2004) as Office worker
 The Taste of Tea (2004) (Cameo, anime director)
 Koi no Mon (Otakus in Love) (2004) (Cameo)
 Funky Forest (2004) (Actor)
 Nihon Chinbotsu (2006) (Yamashiro's Son in law)
 The Catch Man (2006), (Actor)
 Welcome to the Quiet Room (Quiet room ni yôkoso) (2007) as Doctor
 Death Kappa (2010) (Actor)
 The Wind Rises (2013) (Voice, Jiro Horikoshi, main character)
 The Kingdom of Dreams and Madness (Documentary film) (2013) (Self)
 Shin Godzilla (2016) as Passerby (uncredited)
 Last Letter (2020)
 Shin Ultraman (2022) as Ultraman (motion capture; with Bin Furuya)
 Ichikei's Crow (2023) (Cameo)

Other credits
 Royal Space Force: The Wings of Honnêamise (1987) (Special effects & production designer)
 The Dragon Dentist (2017) (Executive producer and sound director)
 Virtual-san Looking (2019) (Creative supervisor)

Awards and honours

References

External links
 English profile page, Khara (studio)
  Hideaki Anno Official site
 
  Anno Hideaki's JMDb Listing
 
1996 NewType interview
1997 Animeland interview
"Special Talk: Yutaka Izubuchi x Hideaki Anno" -(2003)

Hideaki Anno
Japanese film directors
Japanese animated film directors
Anime directors
Gainax
Japanese agnostics
Japanese animators
1960 births
Living people
Mythopoeic writers
People from Yamaguchi Prefecture
Osaka University of Arts alumni
Japanese television directors
Japanese male actors
People with mood disorders
Japanese storyboard artists
20th-century Japanese people
21st-century Japanese people
Recipients of the Medal with Purple Ribbon
Mechanical designers (mecha)